Samantha is a Venezuelan telenovela written by Vivel Nouel and produced by Venevisión in 1998. This telenovela lasted 120 episodes and was distributed internationally by Venevisión International.

Alicia Machado and Alejandro Martinez starred as the main protagonists with Nohely Arteaga and Milena Santander as antagonists.

Synopsis
Love literally falls from the sky for Samantha del Llano, a beautiful and free-spirited young peasant, who lives and works at landowner Valdemar Rincon’s lavish hacienda. One day, while wandering around the far reaches of the ranch in search of her horse, Samantha sees a small private plane crash nearby, and she immediately runs to the scene of the accident. Inside the plane, she finds Luis Alberto Aranguren, badly hurt but semi-conscious. Although she does not realize it yet, this handsome millionaire from the city will be her one true love.

Because the impact from the crash has caused Luis Alberto to lose his memory, he is unable to tell Samantha and the Rincon family his real identity. They believe him to be merely the pilot, an employee of the powerful Aranguren Corporation instead of its owner. Samantha does not really care who he is - she is a sweet, unpretentious country girl with few ambitions - and her main concern is nursing this stranger back to health. During the following weeks, a magical romance develops between Samantha and Luis Alberto, two persons who know practically nothing about each other, but are simply following their hearts.

However, once Luis Alberto is taken back to the capital, he recovers his memory and unconsciously blacks out everything that happened after the accident, including the loving Samantha. He returns home to discover that his wife, gravely ill for five years, has died. Everyone thinks she succumbed to her illness, but in reality Betzaida, who is secretly in love with Luis Alberto and is now determined to conquer him, murdered her. Another woman will try to do the same: Raiza, Valdemar Rincon’s daughter, a spoiled and selfish college student who set her sights on Luis Alberto after discovering his wealth and social position.

One day, while on a date with Raiza, Luis Alberto suddenly remembers Samantha, her soft touch, her radiant smile, her overpowering sweetness. Realizing what he left behind, he goes back to find her. They marry immediately, in a quiet village ceremony. Upon their return to the city, Samantha must face three formidable enemies: Betzaida, Raiza and Luis Alberto’s teenage daughter, Anabela, who feels betrayed by her father’s wedding, so soon after her mother’s death. Through lies and intrigue, these three women will succeed in tearing Samantha and Luis Alberto apart. They will both have to endure many hardships before they can be reunited to share the immense love that was born so innocently between them and that will live forever.

Cast

Alicia Machado as Samantha del Llano
Alejandro Martinez as Luis Alberto Aranguren Luján
Nohely Arteaga as Raiza Rincón Luzardo
Milena Santander as Betzaida Martínez
Vicente Tepedino as Salvador Hidalgo
Jonathan Montenegro as Alexander Hernández
Daniel Alvarado as Arcadio 'el Maute' Guanipa
Martin Lantigua as Lorenzo del Llano
Gustavo Rodríguez as Don Valdemar Rincón
Elizabeth Morales as Elena de Aranguren
Eva Blanco as Alba Lujan de Aranguren
Haydee Balza as Lavinia Luzardo de Rincón
Daniela Bascopé as Anabela
Jorge Aravena as Rodolfo Villalobos
Carlos Arreaza as Samuel Casanova
Janin Barboza as Cristina
Vangie Labalan as Blanca
Julio Capote as Rosendo
Martha Carbillo as Alexandrina
Katerine Castro as Rina
Francisco Ferrari as Dr. Arturo Hidalgo
Aitor Gaviria as Pascual Martínez
Elaiza Gil as Chicharra
Mauricio González as Padre Lino
Carolina Groppuso as Yusmeri
Olga Henriquez as Vestalia Luzardo
Karl Hoffman as Ramón Demetrio Calzadilla
Ana Martinez as Querubina
Ana Massimo as Laura del Llano
Jenny Noguera as Macarena
Patricia Oliveros as Sarita
Martha Olivo as Doña Teodora Torrealba
Carlos Omaña as Pantoja
Winda Pierralt as Joanna
Mauricio Renteria as Tirzo Guevara
Patricia Tóffoli as Damaris'''
Judith Vasquez as GertrudisSonia Villamizar as Deborah Marcano RodriguezJose Luis Zuleta as Jorge''

References

External links
Samantha at the Internet Movie Database

1998 telenovelas
Venevisión telenovelas
Venezuelan telenovelas
1998 Venezuelan television series debuts
1998 Venezuelan television series endings
Spanish-language telenovelas
Television shows set in Venezuela